The statohm is the unit of electrical resistance in the electrostatic system of units which was part of the CGS system of units based upon the centimetre, gram and second.

The static units in that system were related to the equivalent electromagnetic units by a factor of the speed of light.  Those units were known as absolute units and so the equivalent of the statohm was the abohm and their proportions were:

1 statohm  = c2 abohms = 8.987551787x1020 abohms where c is the speed of light in centimetres per second.

These units are not common now.  The SI unit of resistance is the ohm.  The statohm is nearly a trillion times larger than the ohm and is the largest unit of resistance ever used in any measurement system.  The statohm as a practical unit is as unusably large as the abohm is unusably small.

1 statohm  = 8.987551787x1011 ohms

References

Units of electrical resistance
Centimetre–gram–second system of units